Perry–Shockley House, also known as the Shockley House, was a historic home located at Millsboro, Sussex County, Delaware. It was built in 1901, and was a -story, "T"-plan, wood frame dwelling with a hipped roof in the Queen Anne style.  It had a two-story, gable roofed rear wing and one-story wraparound porch.

It was added to the National Register of Historic Places in 1985.

The house was heavily damaged in a March 2014 fire and no longer exists.

References

Houses on the National Register of Historic Places in Delaware
Queen Anne architecture in Delaware
Houses completed in 1901
Houses in Sussex County, Delaware
National Register of Historic Places in Sussex County, Delaware
Millsboro, Delaware